The Volvo B10 was a front-engined bus chassis built by Volvo in the 1930s.

Some of the buses used for the 1945 "White Buses" operation were built on the B10 chassis.

External links

B10
Bus chassis